Rukirabasaija Daudi Kasagama Kyebambe IV was Omukama (King) of the Kingdom of Toro (one of the four traditional kingdoms located within the borders of what's today Uganda) from 1891 until 1928. He was the 11th Omukama of Toro.

Claim to the throne

He was the youngest surviving son of Rukirabasaija Kasunga Kyebambe Nyaika, the 3rd Omukama of Toro, who reigned between 1872 and 1875. His mother was Vikitoria Kahinju. In 1875, following the death of his father, he fled with his mother and six brothers to Ankole. While there, his two elder brothers were murdered on the orders of the Queen Mother of Ankole, one by the name of Kiboga. He then took refuge in Buganda.

He signed a Treaty with the Imperial British East Africa Company (IBEAC),  and was proclaimed at Kabarole,  by Lord Lugard, August 14, 1891.  He was installed as Omukama of Toro on August 16, 1891, also at Kabarole.

Married life
Omukama Kasagama Kyebambe III married several wives according to ancient custom, but repudiated all of them, except his eleventh and favorite wife, whom he remarried according to Anglican rites at, St John's Cathedral, Kabarole, on May 4, 1896. Her name was Adyeri Damali Tibaitwa, the daughter of Nikodemo Kakurora, Chief of Kitagwenda.

Offspring
He fathered seven (7) sons and six (6) daughters:

 Rukirabasaija Sir George David Matthew Kamurasi Rukidi III, the eleventh (11th) Omukama of Toro, whose mother was Damali Tibaitwa.
 Professor Prince (Omubiito) Akiiki Hosea K. Nyabongo, whose mother is not mentioned. He was born  at Fort Portal in 1907. He received his education at Mengo High School, King's College, Budo, Queen's College, Oxford (Rhodes Scholar) (MA), Carmen Theological Seminary, Yale University. (BSc), and Harvard University, (PhD). He served as a Professor at the University of Alabama and as a Lecturer in Philosophy at A&T University of North Carolina. He also chaired the Uganda Town and Country Planning Board, between 1963 and 1975. He was a member of the Uganda People's Congress. He authored a book; Winds And Lights: African Fairy Tales. He died at Jinja, on October 3, 1975. He was the father of: Prince (Omubiito) Amooti Nyabongo Kyebambe Mukarusa, who was born in Brooklyn, New York, United States, was educated at Tuskegee University and served in the US Air Force, then joined the NYPD.
 Prince (Omubiito) John Rwakatale.
 Prince (Omubiito) Keith Kagoro also known as Keesi Bahindi and was the Omusuga of Rukirabasaija Rukidi III.
 Prince (Omubiito) Switzer Kaijamurubi
 Prince (Omubiito) Solomon Okwiri* who married Angelinah M Okwiri
 Prince (Omubiito) Daniel Ogene 
 Prince (Omubiito) Kiijanangoma father to Kyebambe, Rubambaiguru, Mufumu, Kabasweka and Ada Nyamutoka
 Prince (Omubiito) Frederick.
 Princess (Omubiitokati) Lusi, whose mother was Damali Tibaitwa.
 Princess (Omubiitokati) Ruth Komuntale Keesi Bahindi, whose mother was Damali Tibaitwa. She was born at Kabarole in 1900. She was installed as Rubuga to her brother Omukama Rukidi III, on January 19, 1929.
 Princess (Omubiitokati) Agnes Kakoko.
 Princess (Omubiitokati) Ada Nyamutoka.
 Princess (Omubiitokati) Kabokya.

His reign
He converted to Christianity and was received into the Anglican Church. On March 15, 1896, he was baptized by Bishop Tucker, taking the name of Daudi (David). On March 16, 1908, he was crowned by the Reverend G.R. Blackledge at St. John's Cathedral, Kabarole. In 1918 he was made an honorary member of the Order of the British Empire for services in raising and organising native levies and local Defence Corps in the Uganda Protectorate.

The final years
Omukama Kasagama Kyebambe III died at Kyangabukama, Mwenge on December 31, 1928.

See also
 Omukama of Toro

References

External links

Toro
19th-century rulers in Africa
Converts to Anglicanism
20th-century rulers in Africa
19th-century Anglicans
20th-century Anglicans